The Main Street Kid is a 1948 American comedy film directed by R. G. Springsteen and written by Jerry Sackheim and John K. Butler. The film stars Al Pearce, Janet Martin, Alan Mowbray, Adele Mara, Arlene Harris and Emil Rameau. The film was released on January 1, 1948 by Republic Pictures.

Plot

Cast   
Al Pearce as Otis Jones
Janet Martin as Jill Jones
Alan Mowbray as The Great Martine
Adele Mara as Gloria
Arlene Harris as Edie Jones
Emil Rameau as Max
Byron Barr as Bud Wheeling 
Douglas Evans as Mark Howell
Roy Barcroft as Torrey
Phil Arnold as Riley
Sarah Edwards as Mrs. Clauson
Earle Hodgins as Judge Belin
Dick Elliott as Sam Trotter

References

External links 
 

1948 films
American comedy films
1948 comedy films
Republic Pictures films
Films directed by R. G. Springsteen
American black-and-white films
1940s English-language films
1940s American films